The Pinacate Peaks (Sierra Pinacate) are a group of volcanic peaks and cinder cones located mostly in the Mexican state of Sonora along the international border adjacent to the U.S. state of Arizona, surrounded by the vast sand dune field of the Gran Desierto de Altar, at the desert's southeast.

The Spanish name for the Pinacate Peaks geographic feature is the Sierra Pinacate, which is used in their homeland of Mexico.

Location
The Pinacate Peaks lie just north of the fishing resort of Puerto Peñasco.  The tallest of the peaks is Cerro del Pinacate (also called Volcan Santa Clara), elevation 3,904 feet (1,190 m).  The Mexican Spanish word pinacate is derived from the Nahuatl word for the endemic desert stink beetle, pinacatl.

Natural History

Geology 
The volcanoes here have erupted here sporadically since about 4 million years ago, probably in association with the opening of the Gulf of California.  The most recent volcanic activity was about 11,000 years ago.  The Pinacate Desert is home to the largest sand dunes of the Americas.

Flora and fauna 
A variety of flora and fauna occur in the Pinacate Mountains, including the sculptural Elephant Tree,  Bursera microphylla.

Human history
Padre Eusebio Kino, founder of many Spanish missions in the Sonoran Desert, explored here in 1698 and several times later.

NASA sent astronauts here starting in 1965 for geologic training, given the similarity of the terrain to the lunar surface, and included training models of lunar surface equipment.  Apollo 14's Alan Shepard and Ed Mitchell, and Apollo 17's Jack Schmitt trained here in Feb. 1970.

El Pinacate y Gran Desierto de Altar Biosphere Reserve 

The El Pinacate y Gran Desierto de Altar Biosphere Reserve is a biosphere reserve, in the spanish language Reserva de la Biosfera el Pinacate y Gran Desierto de Altar, managed by the Mexican Federal Government's SEMARNAT - the Ministry of the Environment and Natural Resources, in collaboration with the government of the  State of Sonora's IMADES agency.

The reserve 
Facts about the reserve:
 Over 
 Over 400 cinder cones (caused by volcanic activity)
 9 massive volcanic craters
 Remains of volcanic activity (ash, basalt rock, lava fields)
 Over 560 plant species
 56 mammal species
 43 reptile species
 222 bird species
 4 fish species.

See also
List of volcanoes in Mexico
El Elegante Crater

References

External links

Official Pinacate y Gran Desierto de Altar Biosphere Reserve website
Sierra Pinacate a Volcanic Wonder
Global Volcanism Program: Pinacate
Cerro Pinacate, at summitpost

02
Cinder cones
Natural history of Sonora
Mountain ranges of Sonora
Mountain ranges of the Sonoran Desert
Gran Desierto de Altar
Volcanoes of Sonora
Volcanism of Mexico
Volcanic groups
Geology of Mexico
Landforms of Sonora
Lava fields